Pareiorhaphis nasuta is a species of catfish in the family Loricariidae. It is native to South America, where it occurs in the Doce River basin in the state of Minas Gerais in Brazil. The type locality of the species is a small, shallow river with clear water, slow to moderate current, and a rocky substrate. It is also found in rapids, with larger individuals of the species occurring in faster-flowing areas. The species reaches 9.5 cm (3.7 inches) in standard length, is known to be sexually dimorphic, and is believed to be a facultative air-breather.

References 

Loricariidae
Fish described in 2007
Catfish of South America
Fish of the Doce River basin